Michael Jerome Murphy (1888–1952) was an American Major League Baseball catcher. He played for the St. Louis Cardinals during the  season and the Philadelphia Athletics during the  season.

References

Major League Baseball catchers
St. Louis Cardinals players
Philadelphia Athletics players
Baseball players from Pennsylvania
Dallas Giants players
Montreal Royals players
Binghamton Bingoes players
Buffalo Bisons (minor league) players
1888 births
1952 deaths